Micrococcus (mi’ krō kŏk’ Əs) is a genus of bacteria in the Micrococcaceae family. Micrococcus occurs in a wide range of environments, including water, dust, and soil.  Micrococci have Gram-positive spherical cells ranging from about 0.5 to 3 micrometers in diameter and typically appear in tetrads. They are catalase positive, oxidase positive, indole negative and citrate negative. Micrococcus has a substantial cell wall, which may comprise as much as 50% of the cell mass. The genome of Micrococcus is rich in guanine and cytosine (GC), typically exhibiting 65 to 75% GC-content. Micrococci often carry plasmids (ranging from 1 to 100 MDa in size) that provide the organism with useful traits.

Some species of Micrococcus, such as M. luteus (yellow) and M. roseus (red) produce yellow or pink colonies when grown on mannitol salt agar. Isolates of M. luteus have been found to overproduce riboflavin when grown on toxic organic pollutants like pyridine. Hybridization studies indicate that species within the genus Micrococcus are not closely related, showing as little as 50% sequence similarity. This suggests that some Micrococcus species may, on the basis of ribosomal RNA analysis, eventually be re-classified into other microbial genera.

Environmental
Micrococci have been isolated from human skin, animal and dairy products, and beer. They are found in many other places in the environment, including water, dust, and soil.  M. luteus on human skin transforms compounds in sweat into compounds with an unpleasant odor. Micrococci can grow well in environments with little water or high salt concentrations, including sportswear made with synthetic fabrics. Most are mesophiles; some, like Micrococcus antarcticus (found in Antarctica) are psychrophiles.

Though not a spore former, Micrococcus cells can survive for an extended period of time, both at refrigeration temperatures, and in nutrient-poor conditions such as sealed in amber.

Pathogenesis
Micrococcus is generally thought to be a saprotrophic or commensal organism, though it can be an opportunistic pathogen, particularly in hosts with compromised immune systems, such as HIV patients.  It can be difficult to identify Micrococcus as the cause of an infection, since the organism is a normally present in skin microflora, and the genus is seldom linked to disease.  In rare cases, death of immunocompromised patients has occurred from pulmonary infections caused by Micrococcus.  Micrococci may be involved in other infections, including recurrent bacteremia, septic shock, septic arthritis, endocarditis, meningitis, and cavitating pneumonia (immunosuppressed patients).

Industrial uses
Micrococci, like many other representatives of the Actinobacteria, can be catabolically versatile, with the ability to utilize a wide range of unusual substrates, such as pyridine, herbicides, chlorinated biphenyls, and oil. They are likely involved in detoxification or biodegradation of many other environmental pollutants. Other Micrococcus isolates produce various useful products, such as long-chain (C21-C34) aliphatic hydrocarbons for lubricating oils.

References

External links
 Microbewiki at Kenyon College

Micrococcaceae
Bacteria genera